The Surveillance Calibration (or SURCAL) satellites were a series of radar calibration satellites for the Naval Space Surveillance radar system. They were launched in the 1960s.

Background

The SURCAL series of satellites were produced by the Naval Research Laboratory to act as test and calibration targets for the Naval Space Surveillance radar.  The first SURCAL satellite was intended to remain attached to the launch vehicle and was a 5.5 inch long, 5.5 inch diameter cylinder. The other four SURCAL satellites were box-shaped with solar panels, a transponder, and antennas. They transmitted a 216 MHz signal on command.

Launches

Other vehicles 
Astronautix includes passive satellites such as the SURCAL 150B and SURCAL 160 target objects as part of the SURCAL program.

References 

Satellites of the United States
Spacecraft launched in 1962
Spacecraft launched in 1963
Spacecraft launched in 1965
Spacecraft launched by Thor rockets
Radar calibration satellites